John Alexander Thynne, 4th Marquess of Bath (1 March 1831 – 20 April 1896), styled Viscount Weymouth between March and June 1837, was a British peer and a diplomat for almost sixty years.

Background and education
Born in St James's, he was the son of Henry Thynne, 3rd Marquess of Bath and his wife Harriet, second daughter of Alexander Baring, 1st Baron Ashburton. He succeeded his father as Marquess in June 1837, aged only six. Lord Bath was educated at Eton College and Christ Church, Oxford. He was a devout Anglo-Catholic and a determined opponent of the Public Worship Regulation Act 1874 which sought to suppress Ritualism in the Church of England.

Career
He held the office of Envoy Extraordinary for the coronation of King Pedro V of Portugal on 27 May 1858, and Envoy Extraordinary for the coronation of the Emperor Franz Joseph I as King of Hungary on 25 July 1867.

From 1874 to 1893, he was a trustee of the National Portrait Gallery, as well as a trustee of the British Museum in 1883. He was Chairman of Wiltshire County Council and, having been a Deputy Lieutenant of Somerset from 1853, was appointed Lord Lieutenant of Wiltshire in 1889, a post he held until his death in 1896.

He served as treasurer of the Salop Infirmary in Shrewsbury in 1865.

Beriah Botfield, who tenuously claimed a family connection with the Thynnes, left to the Marquess after his death in 1863 his collections of early printed and colour plate books and paintings including Dutch landscapes, which have largely remained at Longleat House.

Family and death
He married Frances Isabella Catherine Vesey, daughter of Thomas Vesey, 3rd Viscount de Vesci, on 20 August 1861. They had six children:

Sir Thomas Henry Thynne, 5th Marquess of Bath (1862–1946)
Lady Alice Emma Thynne (1864–1942), married 1883 Sir Michael Shaw-Stewart, 8th Baronet.
Lady Katherine Georgina Louisa Thynne (1865–1933), married Evelyn Baring, 1st Earl of Cromer and had issue.
Lord John Boteville Thynne (1867–1887), died young and unmarried.
Lady Beatrice Thynne (1867–1941), died unmarried. She had been the heiress of her brother Alexander, including the manor of Church Stretton, which on her death passed to her nephew Henry, Viscount Weymouth. 
Lieut.-Col. Lord Alexander George Boteville Thynne (1873–14 September 1918), who was a member of parliament for Bath, commanded the 6th Bn. of the Wiltshire Regiment, was awarded the Croix de Guerre (France), was killed in action, and died unmarried.

Lord Bath died in 1896, aged 65, in Italy and was buried at Longbridge Deverill, Wiltshire. His arms were those of Botfield quartering Thynne augmented and were blazoned Quarterly 1 & 4. Barry of ten or and sable (Botfield) 2 & 3. A lion rampant tail nowed (Thynne, augmentation of honour).

References

External links
 

1831 births
1896 deaths
Alumni of Christ Church, Oxford
English Anglo-Catholics
Deputy Lieutenants of Somerset
Lord-Lieutenants of Wiltshire
4
John
Members of Wiltshire County Council
People educated at Eton College
19th-century Anglicans